Nuestra Belleza Mundo El Salvador was a national Beauty pageant in El Salvador. The winner represented El Salvador at Miss World. Between 2006 - 2015, the winner was given the title of Nuestra Belleza Universo and competed at Miss Universe.

History

Miss El Salvador (1972 – 2005)

Miss El Salvador was the organization in charge of choosing the representative to Miss Universe and Miss World. The organization since its birth sent a representative to Miss Universe (except in 1980) and Miss World (from 1975 to 1993, when the organization lost the franchise.) The organization was headed by Mr. Eddie Gonzalez, who was the committed to put El Salvador at the international mark. The format of the competition was based on a representative from each of the 14 departments in the country. During the 1980s due to the Salvadorian Civil War situation, thanks to the special permission granted by The Miss Universe Organization, the representative was chosen behind closed doors. This continued till 1995 when they resumed the national competition.

In 2005, the organization had problems renewing the franchise and lost it.

Nuestra Belleza El Salvador
In 2004, Telecorporacion Salvadorena acquired the franchise for Miss World, and in 2006 acquired the franchise for Miss Universe. The pageant was renamed Nuestra Belleza El Salvador and held two separate pageants to select the delegates to Miss Universe and Miss World. In 2010, the format changed as in that year they decided to select the two representatives in just one pageant. The pageant is open to any girls throughout the whole country. They choose the finalists via casting specials and the contestants are not required to have won a department title, which was the traditional way until 2005. The licensee for Miss Universe was given to the organization Reinado de El Salvador in March 2017 and the Miss World licensee in November 2018.

Titleholders

1954-2005
The Miss El Salvador titleholders represented El Salvador at the Miss Universe competition.

2006-2019
The Miss El Salvador renamed as Nuestra Belleza El Salvador and went to Miss Universe and second placed went to Miss World until 2015. Since the owner of Nuestra Belleza El Salvador does not hold a contest in 2016, the franchise of Miss Universe moved to Reinado de El Salvador Organization and the appointment system inside of Nuestra Belleza El Salvador allows the casting winner to go to Miss World.

Representatives in Big Four pageants
The following women have represented El Salvador in three of the Big Four major international beauty pageants for women. These are Miss World, Miss Universe, Miss International with exception of Miss Earth which has a separate national franchise in El Salvador.

Representatives at Miss Universe
Color key

The official winner of Nuestra Belleza El Salvador competed at the Miss Universe pageant between 2006 - 2017. On occasion, when the winner did not qualify (due to age) for either contest, a runner-up was sent. In 1954 and 1955 the representatives were handpicked, with the exception in 1981, where the winner was sent to Miss World. In 2006, Nuestra Belleza El Salvador acquired the Miss Universe franchise and started crowning two titleholders, one for Miss Universe and another for Miss World, in separate pageants until 2010 when the pageants were merged. Since 2010, two titleholders were crowned at the same event. But in 2017, the organization gave up the franchise license of Miss Universe and only one titleholder would be crowned to compete at Miss World.

(*) 2011: Due to personal accident, Alejandra Ochoa (Original winner) was replaced by Mayra Aldana (2nd Runner-up).
(**) 2015: Nuestra Belleza is postponed. Idubina Rivas was appointed as Miss Universe El Salvador 2015 by National Director of Miss Universe in El Salvador. She was the winner of Reinado de El Salvador 2014.

Representatives at Miss World
In 1978 and 1979, the winner of Miss El Salvador competed at both Miss Universe and Miss World pageants. Since 2006, the representative for Miss Universe and Miss World were crowned at the same event. But in 2017, only one titleholder would be crown, since the company lost the Miss Universe franchise.

(*) 2015: Nuestra Belleza is postponed. Marcela Santamaria was appointed as Miss World El Salvador 2015 She was the winner of Reinado de El Salvador 2011.
(*) 2016: Ana Cortez was appointed to represent El Salvador at Miss World 2016.
(*) 2017: Fatima Molina was appointed to represent El Salvador at Miss World 2017.

Representatives at Miss International
In 1992 the third title of Miss El Salvador will be competing at Miss International pageant. In 2006 Miss El Salvador lost the franchise of the pageant. Nowadays, the official candidate for Miss International will be selecting by Reinado de El Salvador pageant together with some Big Four international beauty pageants.

References

External links
Nuestra Belleza El Salvador official website

 
El Salvador
Recurring events established in 1954
2006 establishments in El Salvador
Salvadoran awards